Pretty Pine is a community in the central part of the Riverina and situated about 17 kilometres south of Wanganella and 18 kilometres north west of Deniliquin.

Pretty Pine Post Office opened on 6 October 1890, was reduced to a Telephone office only in 1942 and closed in 1954.

Notes and references

Towns in the Riverina
Towns in New South Wales